Waterford School may also refer to:

Waterford School, a private school in Sandy, Utah
Waterford School District, a school district in Waterford Township, Michigan
Waterford High School (disambiguation), a list of high schools with similar names